St. Mary Catholic Secondary School is a Catholic secondary school located in Hamilton. It is a part of the Hamilton Wentworth Catholic District School Board.

History 
St. Mary Catholic Secondary School opened in 1970 in the former Christ the King Elementary School. It moved to the former Hamilton Teacher's College in 1980. Due to overcrowding, planning for a new school on the current location started in 1992.

Feeder schools 
St. Mary Catholic Secondary School feeder schools are: Canadian Martyrs, Guardian Angels, and St. Joseph in Hamilton; Our Lady of Mount Carmel in Carlisle; St. Augustine and St. Bernadette in Dundas; and St. Thomas in Waterdown.

Extracurriculars

Rowing 
The woman’s program has captured 12 National Championship titles, while the men’s program earned its first National Championship title in 2005.

Notable alumni 
 Jamie Barresi – former offensive coordinator of the Hamilton Tiger-Cats and head coach of the Ottawa Gee-Gees 
 Mark Jankowski – professional ice hockey player
 Catherine McKenna – former minister of Infrastructure and Communities
 Joe Stankevicius – Olympic rower
 Carter Verhaeghe – professional ice hockey player

See also 
 List of secondary schools in Ontario

References

External links 
 

High schools in Hamilton, Ontario
Catholic secondary schools in Ontario